David and Goliath, also known as David with the Head of Goliath, and David Victorious over Goliath, is an oil painting by the Italian Baroque master Caravaggio. It was painted in about 1599, and is held in the Museo del Prado, Madrid. Two later versions of the same theme are currently to be seen in Kunsthistorisches Museum, Vienna (David with the Head of Goliath), and in Rome's Galleria Borghese (David with the Head of Goliath).

History 
The David and Goliath in the Prado was painted in the early part of the artist's career, while he was a member of the household of Cardinal Francesco Maria Del Monte. It shows the Biblical David as a young boy (in accordance with the Bible story) fastening the head of the champion of the Philistines, the giant Goliath, by the hair. The light catches on David's leg, arm and flank, on the massive shoulders from which Goliath's head has been severed, and on the head itself, but everything else is dark. Even David's face is almost invisible in the shadows. A wound on Goliath's forehead shows where he has been felled by the stone from David's sling. The overwhelming impression is of some action intensely personal and private - no triumph, no armies, no victory.

Caravaggio originally showed Goliath's face fixed in wild-eyed open-mouthed terror, tongue rolling, eyeballs swivelled to the edges of the sockets. In the finished painting the melodrama is banished: the drama is transferred from Goliath to the quietly efficient David, his face almost hidden, intent on his work with his hands in his enemy's hair, kneeling almost casually on the man's torso.

This painting and two others done at about the same time – the first version of Sacrifice of Isaac and the first John the Baptist – were taken to Spain shortly after they were made, where they were frequently copied and made a deep impression on art in that country.

See also
David and Goliath (Titian)
David and Goliath (Artemisia Gentileschi)

References

Sources

External links

1599 paintings
Paintings by Caravaggio
Paintings of the Museo del Prado by Italian artists
Paintings about death
Paintings depicting David
Christian art about death